Karayar (Qarayar) is a rural locality (a selo) and the administrative centre of Karayarsky Selsoviet, Karaidelsky District, Bashkortostan, Russia. The population was 751 as of 2010. There are 12 streets.

Geography 
Karayar is located 28 km south of Karaidel (the district's administrative centre) by road. Abdullino is the nearest rural locality.

References 

Rural localities in Karaidelsky District